Sompa is a 2012 Tulu comedy film directed by Rajan Lyallpuri and produced by Namratha Hegde Productions, starring Sadashiv Amprapurkar, Arvind Bolar, Ajathashatru and Namratha Hegde. The comedy is set in Mangalore, and marks the first appearance of veteran Indian actor Sadashiv Amrapurkar in a Tulu film.

The film's working title was Raampa, named after Ramappa Poojary, a hotelier. Before the film was released, the title had been changed to Sompa, following objections from the Poojary family.

Cast
 Namratha Hegde
 Sadashiv Amrapurkar
 Ajathashatru
 Aravind Bolar
 Ravi Surathkal
 Prabhakar Shetty
 Chandravati Vasanth
 Shashiraj Kavoor
 Shobha Shetty

Soundtrack
The music of the film was composed by Iqbal Darbar. After a series of Bollywood hits he has now composed songs for his first Tulu film sung by Dr. Nitin Acharya, winner of the Voice of Bangalore contest held in Bangalore, Karnataka.

References

External links
 

2012 films
Films shot in Mangalore
Tulu-language films